The 2001 NBL season was the 20th season of the National Basketball League. The Waikato Titans won the championship in 2001 to claim their first league title. The Titans set an NBL record with a 15-game winning streak during the season, a streak that was not broken until the 2015 Southland Sharks squad recorded a 16-game winning streak.

Summary

Regular season standings

Playoff bracket

Awards

Statistics leaders
Stats as of the end of the regular season

Regular season
 NZ Most Valuable Player: Phill Jones (Nelson Giants)
 Most Outstanding Guard: Phill Jones (Nelson Giants)
 Most Outstanding NZ Guard: Phill Jones (Nelson Giants)
 Most Outstanding Forward: Clifton Bush (Waikato Titans)
 Most Outstanding NZ Forward/Centre: Terrence Lewis (Canterbury Rams)
 Scoring Champion: Clifton Bush (Waikato Titans)
 Rebounding Champion: Brian Gomes (North Harbour Kings)
 Assist Champion: Paul Henare (Auckland Stars)
 Rookie of the Year: Damon Rampton (Nelson Giants)
 Coach of the Year: Nenad Vučinić (Nelson Giants)
 All-Star Five:
 G: Hayden Allen (Otago Nuggets)
 G: Phill Jones (Nelson Giants)
 F: Clifton Bush (Waikato Titans)
 F: Brian Gomes (North Harbour Kings)
 C: Pero Cameron (Waikato Titans)

References

External links
2001 season review
2001 extended season review

National Basketball League (New Zealand) seasons
NBL